Craven County is located in the U.S. state of North Carolina. As of the 2020 census, the population was 100,720. Its county seat is New Bern. The county was created in 1705 as Archdale Precinct from the now-extinct Bath County. It was renamed Craven Precinct in 1712 and gained county status in 1739. It is named for William, Earl of Craven, who lived from 1606 to 1697. Craven County is part of the New Bern, NC, Metropolitan Statistical Area.

History

Early history 
On August 4, 1661, George Durant purchased land from Cisketando, king of the Yeopim Indian tribe. On March 13, 1662, a second purchase was made from Kilcocanen, another Yeopim. By 1662 Durant was living in Virginia on a tract of land along the Perquimans River which flows into Albemarle Sound, which became part of the Carolina colony in 1665.

Creation 
The land eventually constituting Craven was first organized as a portion of Bath County. On December 3, 1705, a portion of Bath was split off to form the new Archdale County. In about 1712 it was renamed Craven County. According to historian William S. Powell, it was most likely named in honor of William, Lord Craven a lord proprietor of the Carolina colony who died the previous year. Others state that the county was named for William's great uncle, William, Earl of Craven, who was one of the original eight lords proprietor of the colony, or the Lord Craven's son, also William, Lord Craven, who was actively serving as a lord proprietor at the time the county's name was changed. In 1722 a portion of Craven was split off to form Carteret County. New Hanover County and Johnston County were formed from Craven in 1729 and 1746, respectively. Craven's borders were altered and redrawn several times between 1757 and 1852.

During the initial years of colonization, the population of Craven County was sparse and grew slowly. By 1740, however, the town of New Bern began growing rapidly and became the seat for the Governorship. John Carter served as the first sheriff of Craven County, but died in 1740 in the line of duty, when ambushed by an outlaw he was trying to apprehend. In 1746 an act was passed establishing New Bern as the capital of the province and, although the act was later repealed, the General Court met at New Bern in Craven County after 1747.

In 1749 James Davis, the colony's first printer, arrived at New Bern and became the official printer for the North Carolina Assembly. In 1751, Davis established and began printing the North-Carolina Gazette, North Carolina's first newspaper. In 1754 he was elected Sheriff of Craven County.

Antebellum period 
Craven developed an economy centered around agriculture, timber and turpentine, small manufacturing, and commerce emanating from the port of New Bern. Various fruits and vegetables were among the most popular crops, with cotton production declining in popularity after adverse weather conditions in 1821. Some cattle was also kept in the county. Commercial fishing became more common in the late 1840s, while shipbuilding declined later in the Antebellum period. Slaves served as a key labor force in the local economy, though unlike other eastern counties in the state, which had overwhelmingly rural slave populations, almost 40 percent of Craven's slaves were kept in New Bern. 

The Panic of 1819 heavily impacted the county and triggered a two decade-long period of economic contraction. Railroad service was introduced in the 1850s. The population rose from 13,394 in 1820 to 16,268 by 1860, though poverty remained a problem and many born in the country migrated elsewhere in search of better economic prospects. Despite the difficulties, Craven remained a center of political and social activity in the state and New Bern remained one of the largest cities in North Carolina throughout the antebellum period.

Civil War 
Following North Carolina's secession from the United States and entrance into the American Civil War on the side of the Confederate States of America in 1861, New Bern became a center for Confederate political and military activity. By March 1862, the white men of the county had formed nine permanent companies of troops and three temporary ones. Some of these forces served throughout the entire war's duration. The Battle of Hatteras Inlet Batteries in August 1861 gave United States forces a foothold in eastern North Carolina and provoked the flight of women and children from New Bern.

Reconstruction 
The county's economy was heavily impacted by the Civil War with the depletion of livestock, damage of property, and the emancipation of slaves. Most food crop production also suffered, though cotton, tobacco, and rice yields increased. Lumber and naval stores industries persisted, though somewhat weakened. The conclusion of the conflict led to regained confidence in economic activity. The shipping industry in New Bern grew and several new businesses, including a bank, were established. Some black freedmen were assigned work by federal troops or enrolled into Freedmen's Bureau schools. Most of the rest found unskilled work in the local farming, fishing, and turpentine industries. Those that entered skilled labor professions were faced with a rivalry from white contemporaries.

The advent of Congressional Reconstruction in 1867 and 1868 led to profound political changes in Craven County. General Edward Canby, the commander of the Second Military District, replaced New Bern's municipal government and also chose the county's sheriff. Following registration efforts, black voters outnumbered whites in the county, and remained a majority of the electorate until the end of the century. Together with local whites who had held 
Unionist sympathies before the war and recently arrived carpetbaggers, they constituted a strong base for the Republican Party. In the returns for the 1868 elections, Republicans' margin of victory was the second largest among the counties in the state. A portion of Craven was annexed to the new Pamlico County in 1872.

Geography

It is bordered by Pitt County, Beaufort County, Pamlico County, Carteret County, Jones County, and Lenoir County.

National protected area
 Catfish Lake South Wilderness (part)
 Croatan National Forest (part)

State and local protected areas/sites
 Croatan Game Land (part)
 Great Lake Recreation Site (part)
 New Bern Battlefield Site
 Pine Cliff Recreation Area
 Latham-Whitehurst Nature Park
 Special Secondary Nursery Areas
 Tryon Palace

Major water bodies 
 Adams Creek
 Alligator Gut
 Catfish Lake
 Clubfoot Creek
 Ellis Simon Lake
 Hancock Creek
 Intracoastal Waterway
 Little Lake
 Long Lake
 Neuse River
 Trent River
 Great Lake
 Upper Broad Creek

Major highways

  (Concurrency with US 70)
 
  (New Bern)
  (Vanceboro)

Major infrastructure
 Amtrak Thruway (New Bern and Havelock)
 Cherry Branch - Minnesott Beach Ferry (To Pamlico County)
 Coastal Carolina Regional Airport
 MCAS Cherry Point, military base located in Havelock

Demographics

2020 census

As of the 2020 United States census, there were 100,720 people, 42,221 households, and 28,502 families residing in the county.

2000 census
As of the census of 2000, there were 91,436 people, 34,582 households, and 25,071 families residing in the county.  The population density was 129 people per square mile (50/km2).  There were 38,150 housing units at an average density of 54 per square mile (21/km2).  The racial makeup of the county was 69.94% White, 25.12% Black or African American, 0.42% Native American, 0.99% Asian, 0.06% Pacific Islander, 1.78% from other races, and 1.68% from two or more races.  4.02% of the population were Hispanic or Latino of any race.

There were 34,582 households, out of which 33.30% had children under the age of 18 living with them, 56.80% were married couples living together, 12.50% had a female householder with no husband present, and 27.50% were non-families. 23.40% of all households were made up of individuals, and 8.90% had someone living alone who was 65 years of age or older.  The average household size was 2.50 and the average family size was 2.93.

In the county, the population was spread out, with 24.60% under the age of 18, 12.80% from 18 to 24, 27.90% from 25 to 44, 21.20% from 45 to 64, and 13.40% who were 65 years of age or older.  The median age was 34 years. For every 100 females there were 101.90 males.  For every 100 females age 18 and over, there were 101.50 males.

The median income for a household in the county was $35,966, and the median income for a family was $42,574. Males had a median income of $28,163 versus $21,412 for females. The per capita income for the county was $18,423.  About 9.90% of families and 13.10% of the population were below the poverty line, including 18.50% of those under age 18 and 11.00% of those age 65 or over.

Government and politics

Government 
Craven County is led by a seven-member board of commissioners, each of whom are elected to represent a district.

Craven County is a member of the Eastern Carolina Council of Governments, a regional multi-county planning and economic coordination body. It is located in the North Carolina Senate's 2nd district and the North Carolina House of Representatives' 3rd district, and 13th district.

Craven County lies within the bounds of the 4th Prosecutorial District, the 3B Superior Court District, and the 3B District Court District.

Politics 

Craven is a typical “Solid South” county in its presidential voting patterns. It was solidly Democratic until the 1960s: in five elections from 1932 to 1948 the Republican Party did not reach fifteen percent of the vote, and only in 1928 when a large anti-Catholic vote was cast against Al Smith did the GOP reach twenty percent between at least 1900 and 1948. The national Democratic party's support for the Civil Rights Movement caused its white electorate to defect to George Wallace’s American Independent campaign in 1968. Since that time, Craven has become a strongly Republican county. The last Democrat to carry Craven County was Jimmy Carter in 1976. As of March 2022, there were 70,286 registered voters in the county. Of those, 26,225 were registered Republican, 20,135 were registered Democrats, and 23,393 registered unaffiliated.

Communities

Cities
 Havelock
 New Bern (county seat and largest city)

Towns
 Bridgeton
 Cove City
 Dover
 River Bend
 Trent Woods
 Vanceboro

Census-designated places
 Brices Creek
 Cherry Branch
 Fairfield Harbour
 James City
 Neuse Forest

Other unincorporated communities
 Adams Creek
 Ernul
 Fort Barnwell
 Harlowe
 Askin

Townships
By the requirements of the North Carolina Constitution of 1868, the county was divided into 9 townships which do not have names:

 Township 1
 Township 2
 Township 3
 Township 4
 Township 5
 Township 6
 Township 7
 Township 8
 Township 9

See also
 List of counties in North Carolina
 National Register of Historic Places listings in Craven County, North Carolina
 North Carolina Ferry System
 List of wilderness areas of the United States
 List of future Interstate Highways
 PepsiCo, former headquarters was located in New Bern where the drink was first coined

References

Works cited
 
 

 

 

 

 
  - link to Davis biography

Further reading
 Browning, Judkin. Shifting Loyalties: The Union Occupation of Eastern North Carolina (Univ of North Carolina Press, 2011). focus on Craven County
 Kinsey, Marissa N. "Beyond the Vale: Visualizing Slavery in Craven County, North Carolina." (2017). online
 Farmer, Vina Hutchinson. New Bern (Arcadia Publishing, 2007).

External links

 
 
 Craven County Economic Development
 Havelock Chamber of Commerce
 New Bern Chamber of Commerce
 Craven County, NCGenWeb
 New Bern Sun Journal

 
New Bern micropolitan area
1739 establishments in North Carolina
Populated places established in 1739